Live Evil may refer to:

 Live-Evil (Miles Davis album), 1971
 Live Evil (Black Sabbath album), 1982
 "Live Evil" (song), by Flatlinerz, 1994
 Live Evil (film), a 2009 American horror film